Harry Claude Henderson (2 July 1880 – 21 August 1964) was an Australian rules footballer who played with Melbourne in the Victorian Football League (VFL).

Notes

External links 

Demonwiki profile

1880 births
Australian rules footballers from Victoria (Australia)
Melbourne Football Club players
1964 deaths